Washington's 2nd congressional district includes all of Island, San Juan, Skagit, and Whatcom counties, as well as western Snohomish County. It stretches from Bellingham and the Canada–US border in the north to Lynnwood and the King/Snohomish county line in the south. Since 2001, it has been represented by Democrat Rick Larsen.

Originally created in 1909, when Washington was broken up into districts, the second district was represented by future U.S. Senator Henry M. "Scoop" Jackson between 1941 and 1953. It was a reliably Democratic district for most of the latter half of the 20th century, until the Republican Revolution of 1994, when retiring Rep. Al Swift was replaced by Jack Metcalf. Larsen has represented the district since Metcalf's retirement in 2001. He faced a close re-election in 2002, but was handily re-elected in 2004, and didn't face serious opposition until 2010. In the 2008 election, Larsen easily defeated Republican challenger Rick Bart. In the 2010 election, Larsen narrowly avoided defeat against Republican challenger John Koster.

The district has leaned Democratic in presidential elections since the 1988 election. Al Gore and John Kerry narrowly carried the district in 2000 and 2004 with 48% and 51% of the vote, respectively. In 2008, Barack Obama won the district by a wide margin, carrying 55.60% of the vote while John McCain received 42%.

Recent presidential election results

List of members representing the district

Recent election results

2010

2012

2014

2016

2018

2020

2022

See also 

2008 United States House of Representatives elections in Washington
2010 United States House of Representatives elections in Washington
2012 United States House of Representatives elections in Washington
2014 United States House of Representatives elections in Washington
2016 United States House of Representatives elections in Washington

References

 Congressional Biographical Directory of the United States 1774–present

External links
Washington State Redistricting Commission
Find your new congressional district: a searchable map, Seattle Times, January 13, 2012

02